Derek Whitehead (born 14 February 1944) is an English former professional rugby league footballer who played in the 1960s and 1970s. He played at representative level for Great Britain and Lancashire, and at club level for Folly Lane ARLFC  (in Pendlebury), Swinton, Oldham and Warrington (Heritage № 694), as a goal-kicking , i.e. number 1.

Background
Derek Whitehead was a pupil at Cromwell Road Secondary Modern School for Boys in Pendlebury from 1955 to 1959.

Playing career

International honours
Derek Whitehead won caps for Great Britain while at Warrington in 1971 against France (2 matches), and New Zealand.

Challenge Cup Final appearances
Derek Whitehead played , scored seven goals, and was man of the match winning the Lance Todd Trophy in Warrington's 24-9 victory over Featherstone Rovers in the 1974 Challenge Cup Final during the 1973–74 season at Wembley Stadium, London on Saturday 11 May 1974, in front of a crowd of 77,400, and scored two goals in the 7-14 defeat by Widnes in the 1975 Challenge Cup Final during the 1974–75 season at Wembley Stadium, London on Saturday 10 May 1975, in front of a crowd of 85,998.

County Cup Final appearances
Derek Whitehead played  in Oldham's defeat by St. Helens in the 1968 Lancashire Cup Final during the 1968–69 season at Central Park, Wigan on Friday 25 October 1968.

BBC2 Floodlit Trophy Final appearances
Derek Whitehead played  and scored a try in Swinton's 2-7 defeat by Castleford in the 1966 BBC2 Floodlit Trophy Final during the 1966–67 season at Wheldon Road, Castleford on Tuesday 20 December 1966, played  in Warrington's 0-0 draw with Salford in the 1974 BBC2 Floodlit Trophy Final during the 1974–75 season at the Willows, Salford on Tuesday 17 December 1974, and played , and scored a goal in the 5-10 defeat by Salford in the 1974 BBC2 Floodlit Trophy Final replay during the 1974–75 season at Wilderspool Stadium, Warrington on Tuesday 28 January 1975.

Player's No.6 Trophy Final appearances
Derek Whitehead played , and scored a try, and 6-goals in Warrington's 27-16 victory over Rochdale Hornets in the 1973–74 Player's No.6 Trophy Final during the 1973–74 season at Central Park, Wigan on Saturday 9 February 1974. Derek Whitehead set the record for the most goals in a Regal Trophy (or precursors) Final with 6-goals, this was extended to 8-goals by Frano Botica, Derek Whitehead set the record for the most points in a Regal Trophy (or precursors) Final with 15-points, this was extended to 16-points by Frano Botica.

Captain Morgan Trophy Final appearances
Derek Whitehead played , scored two goals, and was presented with an 80oz magnum bottle of Captain Morgan Rum in Warrington's 4-0 victory over Featherstone Rovers in the 1973–74 Captain Morgan Trophy Final during the 1973–74 season at the Willows, Salford on Saturday 26 January 1974, in front of a crowd of 5,259.

Testimonial match
Derek Whitehead's Testimonial match at Warrington took place in 1980.

Honoured at Warrington
Derek Whitehead is a Warrington Wolves Hall of Fame inductee.

References

External links
!Great Britain Statistics at englandrl.co.uk (statistics currently missing due to not having appeared for both Great Britain, and England)
Statistics at orl-heritagetrust.org.uk 
Derek Whitehead joins Hall of Fame
Better than winning the Lance Todd Trophy
Derek Whitehead :: 1969-1979
Alan Buckley was 'a hell of a centre'
Lance Todd winner is backing Wolves
Statistics at wolvesplayers.thisiswarrington.co.uk

1944 births
Living people
English rugby league players
Great Britain national rugby league team players
Lancashire rugby league team players
Lance Todd Trophy winners
Oldham R.L.F.C. players
People from Swinton, Greater Manchester
Place of birth missing (living people)
Rugby league fullbacks
Swinton Lions players
Warrington Wolves players